Edward Neblett (born 1964) is a Barbadian former boxer. He competed in the men's middleweight event at the 1984 Summer Olympics. At the 1984 Summer Olympics, he lost to Virgil Hill of the United States. Neblett also represented Barbados at the 1983 Pan American Games.

References

External links
 

1964 births
Living people
Barbadian male boxers
Olympic boxers of Barbados
Boxers at the 1984 Summer Olympics
Pan American Games competitors for Barbados
Boxers at the 1983 Pan American Games
Place of birth missing (living people)
Middleweight boxers